This article lists events from the year 1990 in Peru.

Incumbents
 President: Alan García (until 27 July), then Alberto Fujimori
 Prime Minister: Guillermo Larco Cox (until 28 July), then Juan Carlos Hurtado Miller

Events
 8 April – General election.
 1 December–10 December – South American Games take place in Lima.

Birth
 25 July – Raúl Ruidíaz, footballer

References

 
1990s in Peru
Years of the 20th century in Peru
Peru
Peru